The Archbishop of Cologne is an archbishop governing the Archdiocese of Cologne of the Catholic Church in western North Rhine-Westphalia and is also a historical state in the Rhine holding the birthplace of Beethoven and northern Rhineland-Palatinate in Germany and was ex officio one of the Prince-electors of the Holy Roman Empire, the Elector of Cologne, from 1356 to 1801.

Since the early days of the Catholic Church, there have been ninety-four bishops and archbishops of Cologne. Seven of these ninety-four retired by resignation, including four resignations which were in response to impeachment. Eight of the bishops and archbishops were coadjutor bishops before they took office. Seven individuals were appointed as coadjutors freely by the Pope. One of the ninety-four moved to the Curia, where he became a cardinal. Additionally, six of the archbishops of Cologne were chairmen of the German Bishops' Conference.

Cardinal Rainer Woelki has been the Archbishop of Cologne since his 2014 transfer from Berlin, where he was also Cardinal Archbishop.

Bishops and Archbishops of Cologne

Bishops of Colonia Agrippina, 88–784

All names before Maternus II are to be approached with considerable skepticism, as little contemporary evidence is available. Maternus was present at a council in Rome in 313. The bishops between Severinus and Charentius are also apocryphal. Domitianus was the Bishop of Maastricht (Mosa Traiectum). The given dates of office before Gunther are also conjectural, at best.

Maternus I c. 88–128
Paulinus
Marcellinus
Aquilinus
Levoldus c. 248–285
Maternus II c. 285–315
Euphrates c. 315–348
Severinus c. 348–403
Ebergisil I ? c. 403–440
Solatius c. 440–470
Sunnovaeus c. 470–500
Domitianus fl. c. 535
Charentinus fl. c. 570
Eberigisil II ? c. 580–600 ?
Remedius c. 600 ? –611 ?
Solatius c. 611 ? –622
Cunibert c. 623–663
Bodatus c. 663–674
Stephen 674–680
Adelwin 680–695
Giso 695–708
Anno I 708–710
Faramund 710–713
Agilolf 713–717
Reginfried 718–747
Hildegar 750–753
Bertholm 753–763
Rikulf 763–784

Archbishops of Cologne, 784–1238
Hildebold 784–818
Hadbold 818–842
Hildwin 842–849
Günther 850–864
Hugo Welf 864
Wilbert 870–889
Hermann I 890–924
Wigfried 924–953
Bruno I 953–965
Volkmar 965–969
Gero 969–976
Warin 976–984
Ebergar 984–999
Heribert 999–1021
Pilgrim 1021–1036
Hermann II 1036–1056
Anno II 1056–1075
Hildholf 1076–1078
Sigwin 1078–1089
Hermann III 1089–1099
Friedrich I 1100–1131

Bruno II von Berg 1131–1137
Hugo von Sponheim 1137
Arnold I 1138–1151
Arnold II von Wied 1152–1156
Friedrich II von Berg 1156–1158, nephew of Bruno II von Berg above
Rainald of Dassel 1159–1167
Philipp von Heinsberg 1167–1191, he gained the title of Duke of Westphalia and Angria in 1180, from then on held in personal union by all incumbents of the Cologne see until 1803.
Bruno III von Berg 1191–1192, brother of Friedrich II above
Adolf I von Berg 1192–1205, nephew of Bruno III above
Bruno IV von Sayn 1205–1208 (in opposition)
Dietrich I von Hengebach 1208–1215 (in opposition)
Engelbert II von Berg 1216–1225, nephew of Bruno III above
Heinrich I von Mulnarken 1225–1237

Archbishop-Electors of Cologne, 1238–1803

Modern Archbishops of Cologne: 1824 to date
Ferdinand August von Spiegel 1824–1835
Clemens August II Droste zu Fischering 1835–1845
Cardinal Johannes von Geissel 1845–1864
Cardinal Paul Melchers 1866–1885
Cardinal Philipp Krementz 1885–1899
Hubert Theophil Simar 1899-1902
Cardinal Anton Hubert Fischer 1902–1912
Cardinal Felix von Hartmann 1912–1919
Cardinal Karl Joseph Schulte 1920–1941
Cardinal Josef Frings 1942–1969
Cardinal Joseph Höffner 1969–1987
Cardinal Joachim Meisner 1988–2014
Cardinal Rainer Maria Woelki since 2014

Auxiliary bishops

See also 
 Roman Catholic Archdiocese of Cologne
 Cologne Cathedral

References

External links 
 List of Bishops and Archbishops of Cologne Archdiocese of Cologne (Erzbistum Köln)
 List of Bishops and Archbishops of Cologne Cologne Cathedral (Kölner Dom)